Andamia pacifica is a species of combtooth blenny which is found in the Kerama Islands near Okinawa, Japan and is probably distributed along the Ryukyu Island chain. It is oviparous, laying adhesive eggs on the substrate, forming distinct pairs.

References

pacifica
Fish described in 1955